Angela Paul, later Angela Edmond (born 27 March 1975), is a luger from New Zealand who has competed for New Zealand at two Olympics. In the 1998 Winter Olympics at Nagano, she came 19th in the Women's Singles; in the 2002 Winter Olympics at Salt Lake City, she came 23rd in the Women's Singles. She was the flag bearer for New Zealand in 2002.

References

Further reading
 Black Gold by Ron Palenski (2008, 2004 New Zealand Sports Hall of Fame, Dunedin) p. 106 

Living people
New Zealand female lugers
Olympic lugers of New Zealand
Lugers at the 1998 Winter Olympics
Lugers at the 2002 Winter Olympics
1975 births